Ključ is a town and municipality located in the Una-Sana Canton of the Federation of Bosnia and Herzegovina, an entity of Bosnia and Herzegovina. The name of the town and the municipality translates to "Key" in English.

Geography
It is located a short distance south from Sanski Most. The Sana River runs through the municipality. The terrain is heavily forested.

History
Human settlements have existed in the area long before the Roman Era. The town itself is first mentioned in 1322 in the documents of ban Stjepan II Kotromanić. It was conquered by the Ottoman Empire in 1463 as the last Royal Bosnian fortress.

From 1929 to 1941, Ključ was part of the Vrbas Banovina of the Kingdom of Yugoslavia.

Kljuc was first mentioned in 1322. In 1463, during the Ottoman invasion of Bosnia, the last Bosnian king Stjepan Tomašević, took refuge in the city. His surrender and execution marked the downfall of the medieval Bosnian state.

The Charter from 1323 states that Vukoslav is the son of duke Hrvatin, and from this we conclude that the main stronghold of the lords of the Donji Kraji was in the town of Ključ, the center of the parish Banica. Evliya Çelebi mentions Ključ and says that he is located in Donji Kraji and on the Sana river.

As an area with a slight Serb majority, at the start of the war in Bosnia (1992-1995), the Ključ area was held by Bosnian Serb forces. In the summer of 1995, the Bosnian governmental forces took control over it.  Most of the pre-war Serb population fled after the Dayton Peace Agreement, the town belongs to the Federation of Bosnia and Herzegovina. Today, it is estimated that about 97% of the population of Ključ are Bosniaks.

Settlements
In 1991, the municipality of Ključ contained 61 settlements:

 Biljani Donji
 Biljani Gornji
 Budelj Gornji
 Busije
 Crkveno
 Crljeni
 Čađavica
 Donja Previja
 Donja Slatina
 Donje Ratkovo
 Donje Sokolovo
 Donji Ramići
 Donji Ribnik
 Donji Vojići
 Donji Vrbljani
 Dragoraj
 Dubočani
 Gornja Previja
 Gornja Slatina
 Gornje Ratkovo
 Gornje Sokolovo
 Gornji Ramići
 Gornji Ribnik
 Gornji Vojići
 Gornji Vrbljani
 Hadžići
 Hasići
 Hripavci
 Humići
 Jarice
 Kamičak
 Ključ
 Kopjenica
 Korjenovo
 Krasulje
 Lanište
 Ljubine
 Međeđe Brdo
 Mijačica
 Peći
 Pištanica
 Plamenice
 Prhovo
 Prisjeka Donja
 Prisjeka Gornja
 Rastoka
 Rudenice
 Sanica
 Sanica Donja
 Sanica Gornja
 Sitnica
 Sredice
 Stražice
 Treskavac
 Velagići
 Velečevo
 Velijašnica
 Velije
 Zableće
 Zavolje
 Zgon

As a result of the war, the villages of Busije, Crkveno, Čađavica, Donja Previja, Donja Slatina, Donji Ribnik, Donji Vrbljani, Dragoraj, Gornja Previja, Gornja Slatina, Gornje Sokolovo, Gornji Ribnik, Gornji Vrbljani, Rastoka, Sitnica, Sredice, Stražice, Treskavac, Velijašnica, Velije et Zableće, as well as parts of Donje Ratkovo, Donje Sokolovo, Dubočani, Gornje Ratkovo, Jarice, Ljubine et Velečevo became a part of Ribnik municipality, Republika Srpska.

Today the municipality of Ključ has 40 settlements:

 Biljani Donji
 Biljani Gornji
 Budelj Gornji
 Crljeni
 Donje Ratkovo (part)
 Donje Sokolovo (part)
 Donji Ramići
 Donji Vojići
 Dubočani (part)
 Gornje Ratkovo (part)
 Gornji Ramići
 Gornji Vojići
 Hadžići
 Hasići
 Hripavci
 Humići
 Jarice (part)
 Kamičak
 Ključ
 Kopjenica
 Korjenovo
 Krasulje
 Lanište
 Ljubine (part)
 Međeđe Brdo
 Mijačica
 Peći
 Pištanica
 Plamenice
 Prhovo
 Prisjeka Donja
 Prisjeka Gornja
 Pudin Han
 Rudenice
 Sanica
 Sanica Donja
 Sanica Gornja
 Velagići
 Velečevo (part)
 Zavolje
 Zgon

Demographics

Population

Ethnic composition

Economy
The area is connected to other parts of Bosnia by the M-5 highway. Forestry, light industry and tourism are major components of the economy.

References

External links

 
 

Cities and towns in the Federation of Bosnia and Herzegovina
Populated places in Ključ
Municipalities of the Una-Sana Canton